Lou Myers (September 26, 1935 – February 19, 2013) was an American actor.

Myers was born in Cabin Creek, West Virginia, the son of Dorothy Jeffries (née Brown).

He was typically typecast as a grumpy old man, but he appeared in many movies, stage plays television sitcoms, and dramas. He got his first break as an understudy in the Broadway play, The First Breeze of Summer as Reverend Mosley. He is perhaps best known as the feisty Mr. Vernon Gaines in the sitcom A Different World. Myers was also an accomplished pianist.
 
Myers died at the Charleston Area Medical Center in West Virginia after battling pneumonia for several months.

Filmography

Awards
Myers won an NAACP Image Award for his role as the Stool Pigeon in the August Wilson play, King Hedley II. He also won the Off-Broadway AUDELCO Award for his role in the play, Fat Tuesday.

In 2005 the Appalachian Education Initiative listed Myers as one of 50 "Outstanding Creative Artists" from the State of West Virginia and featured him in their coffeetable book Art & Soul.

References

External links

Interview with Lou Myers, mosaec.com

1935 births
2013 deaths
African-American male actors
American male film actors
American male television actors
People from Cabin Creek, West Virginia
Male actors from West Virginia
20th-century African-American people
21st-century African-American people
Deaths from pneumonia in West Virginia